Harrison De Nicolo (born 25 June 1999), is an Australian professional soccer player who plays as a forward for Finnish club Vaajakoski.

Club career
On 1 April 2022, De Nicolo signed with Vaajakoski in the Finnish third-tier Kakkonen.

References

External links

1999 births
Living people
Australian soccer players
Association football forwards
Kalamata F.C. players
Levadiakos F.C. players
PAE Kerkyra players
Super League Greece 2 players
Australian expatriate soccer players
Expatriate footballers in Greece
Australian expatriate sportspeople in Greece
Expatriate footballers in Sweden
Australian expatriate sportspeople in Sweden
Expatriate footballers in Finland
Australian expatriate sportspeople in Finland